The L16 81mm mortar is a British standard mortar used by the Canadian Army, British Army, and many other armed forces. It originated as a joint design by the UK and Canada. The version produced and used by Australia is named the F2 81mm Mortar; that used by the U.S. armed forces is known as the M252.

It was introduced in 1965–66, replacing the Ordnance ML 3 inch Mortar in UK service, where it is used by the British Army, the Royal Marines and the RAF Regiment.

In UK armoured/mechanised infantry battalions, the L16 mortar is mounted in an FV 432 AFV (six per battalion mortar platoon). British army light role infantry battalions and the Royal Marines may transport their mortars in BvS 10 vehicles (the replacement for the Bv 206). Otherwise, it is carried disassembled in three loads, (barrel, baseplate and bipod with sights, each approximately 11 kg), normally carried by a vehicle or helicopter and assembled for firing from the ground.

The weapon can be man-packed by the mortar detachment, in which case the ammunition would be carried by other soldiers of the battalion. In addition to their normal equipment, each soldier would carry four bombs in a pair of two-bomb plastic containers (known as greenies in the British Army).

Operators

Current operators
 : known as 'F2 81mm mortar'
 
 
 
 
 
 
 
 
 
 
  – Armed Forces of Malta
 
 
 : L16A2
 : L16A2
 
 
 
 
 
 
 
 
 
 
 : M252 mortar

Former operators
  – Rhodesian Army

Gallery

References

External links

 

Infantry mortars
Cold War weapons of the United Kingdom
Mortars of the United Kingdom
Artillery of Canada
81mm mortars
Military equipment introduced in the 1960s